Ozomdel-e Shomali Rural District is in the Central District of Varzaqan County, East Azerbaijan province, Iran. At the National Census of 2006, its population was 6,654 in 1,551 households. There were 6,331 inhabitants in 1,703 households at the following census of 2011. At the most recent census of 2016, the population of the rural district was 6,143 in 1,976 households. The largest of its 20 villages was Aghbolagh-e Sofla, with 1,418 people.

References 

Varzaqan County

Rural Districts of East Azerbaijan Province

Populated places in East Azerbaijan Province

Populated places in Varzaqan County